Leucosporidium frigidum is a species of yeast that belongs to the genus of fungi Leucosporidium, and the family Leucosporidiaceae.

Growth temperature
Leucosporidium frigidum, together with Leucosporidium gelidum, and Leucosporidium nivalis are classified as obligate psychrophiles since they grow well at subzero temperatures and are unable to grow at temperatures above . Its maximum growth temperature is  when glucose is used as carbon source and  when ethanol is used. The growth rate of Leucosporidium frigidum on glucose as substrate for a given temperature is higher than that on ethanol. The cell yield of Leucosporidium is maximum at subzero temperatures.

Membrane lipid composition
There is a positive correlation between the growth temperature and the degree of fatty-acid unsaturation of the cell lipids of Leucosporidium frigidum. The variation in the degree of fatty acid unsaturation of the yeast indicates its ability to alter the cellular component is fundamental to adaptation to environmental changes. The extent to such ability determines the growth temperature limits of Leucosporidium frigidum. The lower limit is the point at which its membrane lipids solidify and the upper limit is the point at which its membrane lipids melt.

Cytochrome concentration
Leucosporidium frigidum shows absorption bands at room temperature characteristic of cytochromes aa3, b and c. The concentration to the cytochromes in Leucosporidiaceae frigidum is negatively related to its membrane-lipid unsaturation rate. At the maximum growth temperatures when the degree of lipid unsaturation of the cell membrane is high, the final cell yield is less than at lower temperatures when membrane-lipid unsaturation rate is low. This indicates glucose repression of cytochrome synthesis occurs at high degree of lipid unsaturation. However, a high concentration of cytochrome c is observed at the maximum growth temperatures of Leucosporidium frigidum. This phenomenon may be an attempt by the cells to compensate for the decrease in cytochrome a+a3 by involving alternative pathways of electron transport.

Functions of cellular membranes
The positive correlation relationship between the growth temperature of Leucosporidiaceae frigidum and the membrane-lipid unsaturation rate, and the negative relationship between the membrane-lipid unsaturation rate and cytochrome concentration in cells indicate the membrane structure and composition are significant to temperature adaptation in Leucosposidiaceae frigidum. Manipulation of the fatty-acid unsaturation index allows Leucosposidiaceae frigidum to alter its membrane fluidity, and function with changing temperatures.

References

Yeasts
Fungi described in 1969